The 1997 Korea Cup was the 22nd competition of Korea Cup. It was held from 12 to 16 June 1997, and was won by South Korea for the 12th time.

Squads

Standings

Matches

See also
Korea Cup
South Korea national football team results

References

External links
Korea Cup 1997 at RSSSF

1997